Nagadevampalayam is a panchayat village in Gobichettipalayam taluk in Erode District of Tamil Nadu state, India. It is about 8 km from Gobichettipalayam and 43 km from district headquarters Erode. The village is located on the road connecting Gobichettipalayam with Perundurai. Nagadevampalayam has a population of about 4801.

References

Villages in Erode district